Katarzyna Dziedzic was Miss International Canada in 2003. Dziedzic represented Canada in Tokyo, Japan, competing with Ambassadors of Poise, Beauty and Intelligence from all over the world.

Pageant history 
Miss Universe Western Ontario 2002, Windsor, ON (Winner)
Miss Universe Canada 2003, Toronto, ON (Contestant)
Miss International Canada 2003, Edmonton, AB (Winner)
Miss International 2003, Tokyo, Japan (Contestant)
Miss Polonia International 2003, Vienna, Austria (1st Runner- up)
Miss Global Queen 2003, Montreal, PQ (2nd Runner-up)

References 

Year of birth missing (living people)
Living people
Canadian beauty pageant winners
Canadian people of Polish descent
University of Windsor alumni
Miss International 2003 delegates